Adrian van Hooydonk (born 21 June 1964 in Echt, Limburg), is a Dutch automobile designer and  BMW Group's Design Director. He is based in Munich, Germany.

Biography 
He studied at Delft University of Technology in the Netherlands, where he received his diploma in 1988. His career started off with one year as a freelance designer, followed in 1989 as a product designer with GE Plastics Europe, and then returned to study Automotive Design Studies at Art Center Europe in Vevey, Switzerland.

Work at BMW
He joined BMW in 1992 as an automotive exterior designer in Munich, Germany. In 2000 he was Head of Automotive Exterior Design at BMW's industrial design centre DesignworksUSA, quickly becoming the president of Designworks in 2001. He left Designworks in 2005 to be promoted to head up the Brand Design Studio, under the direction of the BMW Group Design Director Chris Bangle, and in 2009 became Director of BMW Group Design, succeeding Chris Bangle as the head of design for the company. As head of group design he oversees the design work of BMW, Mini and Rolls-Royce. He credits Italian architect Mario Bellini as one of his most influential designers.

Attributed designs
BMW 5 Series (2010) 
BMW 6 Series
BMW 7 Series (2008)  
BMW X3
BMW X5
BMW Z9 (1999) 
Mini ACV30 (1997)

See also

 Harm Lagaay
 Emeco collaboration

References

External links
 BMW Designers  Adrian van Hooydonk among the BMW automotive designers.

1964 births
Living people
Dutch automobile designers
Dutch expatriates in Germany
Van Hooydonk, Adrian
People from Echt-Susteren
Delft University of Technology alumni